European route E 92 is an A-Class European route, crossing the Greek regions of Epirus and Thessaly.

E 92 routes through the following local capitals (direction west-east): Igoumenitsa, Ioannina, Trikala, Larisa, Volos.

The part Igoumenitsa - Ioannina is shared with the route E 90. These two cities are also connected by the newly established major highway Egnatia (GR-2).

External links 
 UN Economic Commission for Europe: Overall Map of E-road Network (2007)

92
E092